The 2003 British Open was the 2003 edition of the British Open professional ranking snooker tournament, that was held from 8–16 November 2003 at the Brighton Centre, Brighton, England. Stephen Hendry won the tournament by defeating Ronnie O'Sullivan nine frames to six in the final. The final saw a record 5 centuries in a row from the two players (three from O'Sullivan and two from Hendry, including a 135), which remains a joint record for consecutive centuries made between two players in a professional tournament match and is a standalone record for ranking events and finals.


Prize fund
The breakdown of prize money for this year is shown below:

Winner: £52,000
Runner-up: £26,000
Semi-final: £13,000
Quarter-final: £9,500
Last 16: £7,450
Last 32: £5,600
Last 48: £3,900
Last 64: £2,750

Last 80: £1,750
Last 96: £1,100

Stage one highest break: £1,800
Stage two highest break: £5,000

Stage one maximum break: £5,000
Stage two maximum break: £20,000

Total: £450,000

Main draw

Final

Qualifying
Qualifying for the tournament took place at Pontins in Prestatyn, Wales between 21 and 25 September 2003.

Round 1 
Best of 9 frames

Round 2–4

Century breaks

Qualifying stage centuries

 145, 103  Ian McCulloch
 138, 126, 110  Andy Hicks
 138  Stephen Maguire
 135, 130, 103  Adrian Rosa
 134, 117  Ricky Walden
 133  Fergal O'Brien
 132  Stuart Bingham
 132  Peter Lines
 131  Kwan Poomjang
 125  Darryn Walker
 123, 112  Billy Snaddon
 121  Barry Pinches
 119  Gerard Greene
 118, 109, 103  Tom Ford

 117  Joe Swail
 110, 107  Ryan Day
 110, 104  Andrew Norman
 106  Martin Dziewialtowski
 106  Nick Dyson
 105, 101  David Roe
 104  Phil Williams
 104  Wayne Brown
 102  Ian Brumby
 102  Craig Butler
 102  Marco Fu
 101  Andrew Higginson
 101  Anthony Hamilton

Televised stage centuries

 147, 135, 118  John Higgins
 138  Michael Judge
 135, 135, 134, 133, 121, 120  Stephen Hendry
 130, 127  Ken Doherty
 130  Jimmy White
 123  Alan McManus
 120  Stephen Lee
 116, 100  Dominic Dale
 115, 105  Quinten Hann

 114  David Gray
 112, 104  Paul Hunter
 111, 109  Matthew Stevens
 111, 104  Mark Williams
 109, 106, 100, 100  Ronnie O'Sullivan
 107  Gerard Greene
 107  Graeme Dott
 104  Michael Holt

References

British Open (snooker)
British Open
Open (snooker)
British Open